Vidyullekha Raman (born 4 November 1991), also known as Vidyu Raman, is an Indian actress and comedienne who appears in Tamil and Telugu films. The daughter of actor Mohan Raman, Vidyullekha made her debut in Gautham Vasudev Menon's 2012 Neethaane En Ponvasantham. She won the Nandi Award for Best Female Comedian for the film Run Raja Run (2014).

Early life and career 
Vidyullekha did her schooling in Vidya Mandir Senior Secondary School and later went to MCTM Matriculation, where she developed an interest for theatre and acting. She gained her popularity doing stage productions during her college years at M.O.P. Vaishnav College, where she graduated with a degree in Visual Communication.

She has had over 7 years of theater experience. She made her debut in Gautham Vasudev Menon's 2012 bilingual films Neethaane En Ponvasantham and Yeto Vellipoyindhi Manasu, appearing as Jenny, a friend of the character portrayed by Samantha. The actress has since played pivotal roles opposite N. Santhanam in Sundar C's Theeya Velai Seiyyanum Kumaru, in Malini 22 Palayamkottai and the Telugu film Ramayya Vasthavayya. She was seen in minor roles in both 2014 Pongal releases Jilla and Veeram. She has since then shifted her base to the Telugu film industry.

Personal life 
The actress is the daughter of Indian Tamil film and Tamil television actor Mohan Raman, while her grandfather was the prominent lawyer V. P. Raman. Another uncle, P. S. Raman, was the former Advocate General of Tamil Nadu. Her cousin Gitanjali is married to leading Tamil film maker Selvaraghavan.

Raman got engaged to Sanjay on 26 August 2020 and announced it on Instagram. The couple got married on September 9, 2021, in an intimate ceremony.

Filmography

Television

References

External links 
 

Actresses in Telugu cinema
Actresses in Tamil cinema
Living people
1991 births
Indian film actresses
21st-century Indian actresses
Tamil comedians
Indian women comedians
Actresses from Chennai
Santosham Film Awards winners
Nandi Award winners